The 1886 Connecticut gubernatorial election was held on November 2, 1886. Republican nominee Phineas C. Lounsbury defeated Democratic nominee Edward S. Cleveland with 46.19% of the vote.

This was the second consecutive gubernatorial election in which the Republican-controlled state legislature elected the candidate who received fewer votes. The law at the time specified that if no candidate received a majority, the state legislature would decide the election.

General election

Candidates
Major party candidates
Phineas C. Lounsbury, Republican
Edward S. Cleveland, Democratic

Other candidates
Samuel B. Forbes, Prohibition
Herbert Baker, Labor

Results

References

1886
Connecticut
Gubernatorial